Jason "Jake" Scott (born August 1965) is a British film director who works primarily in the field of music videos and commercials. His father is film director Sir Ridley Scott.

Career

Most of his works were produced under the Ridley Scott Associates banner or RSA's music video subdivision Black Dog Films. He has made videos for Soundgarden, The Smashing Pumpkins, Bush, Live, Blind Melon, Tori Amos, Tricky, Radiohead, Lily Allen, No Doubt, Oasis, The Supernaturals, The Strokes, The Verve, R.E.M., U2, and George Michael.

In January, 2014, he oversaw the production, with 21 editors & 15 cinematographers, of the '1.24.14' film, aired on Apple.com. He was featured in the 'Behind the Scenes' video.

Jake Scott is also the director of The HBO Voyeur Project, a theatrical multimedia experience and marketing campaign launched in the summer of 2007. The project used the concept of voyeurism to show the interconnected stories of fictional characters in a New York apartment building. Voyeur was met with critical and commercial success, attracting millions of viewers and numerous awards including a Cannes Grand Prix for Outdoor Advertising. 

He has also made three feature films: Plunkett & Macleane (1999), Welcome to the Rileys (2010) and American Woman (2018).

Personal life
He is the son of director Sir Ridley Scott, and nephew of Tony Scott and brother of directors Jordan Scott and Luke Scott.

Videography

Filmography
 Plunkett & Macleane (1999)
 Tooth Fairy (2004)
 Welcome to the Rileys (2010)
 American Woman (2018)
 Kipchoge: The Last Milestone (2021)

References

External links

Jake Scott at the Music Video Database

1965 births
Living people
English music video directors
English film directors
Place of birth missing (living people)
English-language film directors
Jake